Kauen was a Nazi concentration camp located in the former Kovno Ghetto. It operated from 15 September 1943 to 14 July 1944 and had eight satellite camps located around the city of Kaunas, in modern-day Lithuania. Most prisoners were Jews who had survived the previous years of the Holocaust in Lithuania. The main camp was liberated by the Red Army on 1 August 1944.

References

Sources
Encyclopedia of Camps and Ghettos, "Kauen" pp. 848–852
Der Ort des Terrors, vol. 8, "Kaunas"

Nazi concentration camps in Lithuania